Robert Andrew Graham, SJ (March 11, 1912, Sacramento, California – February 11, 1997, Los Gatos, California) was an American Jesuit priest and World War II historian of the Catholic Church. He was a vigorous defender of Pope Pius XII over accusations that he had failed to do what he could to defend the Jews and others persecuted by the Nazis.

The son of Charlie Graham, a former professional baseball player for the Boston Red Sox and part owner of the San Francisco Seals, Graham joined the California province of the Jesuits as a young man. He was ordained priest in 1941 and was soon sent to New York City to work on the Jesuit weekly,
America, where he remained for two decades. In 1952, he gained a doctorate in political science and international law from the Graduate Institute of International Studies in Geneva during a sabbatical.

In 1959, his book, Vatican Diplomacy: A Study of Church and State on the International Plane, was published. This treatise on pontifical ecclesiastical diplomacy published by Princeton University Press would endure to become a discipline classic thus qualifying Rev. Graham as one of the Church's experts on the subject of Holy See diplomacy. This classic treatise continues to be used by English-language scholars specializing in the field of pontifical ecclesiastical diplomacy and diplomatic history even today.  Following the publication of his book Rev. Graham travelled the world interviewing witnesses on the Vatican's diplomatic response to Nazism during the Second World War at a time when the Vatican archives remained closed. 

To counter growing attacks, in 1965 the Vatican began publication of some of its wartime documents in a series of books edited by a Jesuit team, Actes et Documents du Saint Siège relatifs à la Seconde Guerre mondiale. Graham joined them in Rome in 1966 from the third volume (eleven would eventually be published by the project's completion in 1981. With Vatican permission, Graham also supplied researchers on request with other documents not included in the published collection.  In 1968, Graham published a book, The Pope and Poland in World War II, a summary of Volume III of the Actes, which deals with the Church in Poland.

Graham often published the findings of his research for La Civiltà Cattolica, the Jesuit-run, Catholic journal in Italy. In 1996, Graham published English translations of some of his La Civilta Cattolica articles in his book, The Vatican and Communism During World War: What Really Happened.

Graham often wrote a column for Columbia, the official magazine of the Knights of Columbus.

Graham's research was not limited to the Vatican archives. When a family friend had mentioned that one of their neighbors in New York spent part of the Second World War as an escaped British prisoner-of-war living in the Vatican, he dropped what he was doing to fly to the US to meet with William C. Simpson.  Simpson who had become part of Hugh O'Flaherty's network, later wrote a book on the subject titled A Vatican Life Line in 1996.

Graham criticised what he called "irresponsible muddying of the well-springs of history" by some writers on the Vatican during the Second World War. He felt that had Pius XII spoken out more forcefully against Nazi persecution, "Hitler would have gone on a rampage of revenge - not only against Jews but against German bishops as well." Graham regarded the refutation of accusations against Pius XII as vital. "While his detractors can no longer injure him, their slanders and insinuations continue to plague the Church, for when a Pope is defamed, the Church suffers."

In matters regarding Pius XII, he worked with Raimondo Spiazzi. He revanched himself with ever new details, documents, or letters, which he continued to discover long after his 80th birthday. The New York Times quoted him "I am 79, I thought I ought to unload this stuff, before I pop off" Graham remained in Rome until illness struck in 1996, when he returned to his native California. He died in 1997, aged 84, leaving behind a large body of published and unpublished work.

Publications 
Alvarez, David and Graham, Robert A. Nothing Sacred: Nazi Espionage Against the Vatican, 1939-1945, Routledge, 1997.
Graham, Robert A, The Vatican and Communism during World War II, What Really Happened, Ignatius Press, 1996.
Graham. Robert A. The Pope in Poland in World War Two, Veritas, 1968
Graham, Robert A., Vatican Diplomacy: A Study of Church & State on the International Plane, Princeton University Press, 1959.

References

External links 
 Robert Graham, S.J.
 Defense of Jews and Others
 Catholic Answers: How Pius XII Protected Jews

1912 births
1997 deaths
20th-century American Jesuits
20th-century American Roman Catholic theologians
Historians of the Catholic Church
People from Sacramento, California
People from Los Gatos, California
University of Geneva alumni
Graduate Institute of International and Development Studies alumni
20th-century American historians
20th-century American male writers
American male non-fiction writers
Catholics from California
American expatriates in Switzerland
Historians from California